This is a list of wars and conflicts involving Burundi and its previous states.

List

Notes 

Burundi

Wars